Knock Knock may refer to:

 Knock-knock joke, a type of joke

Film and television 
 Knock Knock (1940 film), an animated short film noted for the first appearance of Woody Woodpecker
 Knock Knock (2007 film), a horror film featuring Stephanie Finochio
 Knock Knock (2015 film), an erotic horror film starring Keanu Reeves
 Knock Knock Live, a 2015 reality TV series
 "Knock, Knock", an episode of the animated TV series The Real Ghostbusters
 "Knock, Knock", an episode of the TV series Six Feet Under
 Knock Knock Woodpecker, [[The Great Space Coaster#Characters|a character on the TV series The Great Space Coaster]]
 "Knock Knock" (Doctor Who), an episode from the tenth series of Doctor Who "Knock, Knock" (Gotham), an episode from the second season of Gotham Music 
 Albums 
 Knock Knock (DJ Koze album), 2018
 Knock Knock (Smog album), 1999
 Knock Knock, a mixtape by Misha B, 2013

Songs 
 "Knock Knock" (Monica song), 2003
 "Knock Knock" (Twice song), 2017
 "Knock Knock", by the Dazz Band, 1981
 "Knock, Knock", by Dizzee Rascal from Showtime, 2004
 "Knock, Knock", by GZA from Legend of the Liquid Sword, 2002
 "Knock Knock", by the Hives from Veni Vidi Vicious, 2000
 "Knock Knock", by Jasmine, 2010
 "Knock Knock", by Mac Miller from K.I.D.S., 2010
 "Knock, Knock", by Nikki Yanofsky from Little Secret, 2014
 "Knock Knock", by SoFaygo, 2019

 Other uses 
 Knock Knock (company), a California-based gift product and book publishing company
 Knock Knock (play), a 1976 play by Jules Feiffer, originally directed on Broadway by Marshall W. Mason
 Knock-Knock (video game), a 2013 video game by Ice-Pick Lodge

 See also 
 Knock (disambiguation)
 Knock Knock Who?, a 2004 album by Kimya Dawson
 "Knock, Knock Who's There?", a 1970 song by Mary Hopkin
 Knock, Knock, Ginger, a children's game
 Knock Knock Knock'', an EP by Hot Hot Heat